Gedun Drupa (1391–1474) was considered posthumously to have been the 1st Dalai Lama.

Biography 

Gedun Drupa was born in a cow-shed in Gyurmey Rupa near Sakya in the Tsang region of central Tibet, the son of Gonpo Dorjee and Jomo Namkha Kyi, nomadic tribespeople. He was raised as a shepherd until the age of seven. His birth name (according to the Tibetan Buddhist Resource Center, his personal name) was Péma Dorjee ("Vajra Lotus").

Ordination 
Later he was placed in Narthang Monastery. In 1405, he took his śrāmaṇera (novitiate) vows from the abbot of Narthang, Khenchen Drupa Sherap. When he was 20 years old, in about 1411 received the name Gedun Drupa upon taking the vows of a bhikṣu (monk) from the abbot of Narthang Monastery. Also at this age he became a student of the scholar and reformer Je Tsongkhapa (1357–1419), who some say was his uncle. Around this time he also became the first abbot of Ganden Monastery, founded by Tsongkhapa himself in 1409.

Career 
By the middle of his life, Gedun Drupa had become one of the most esteemed scholar-saints in the country. Gedun Drupa founded the major monastery of Tashi Lhunpo at Shigatse, which later became the seat of the Panchen Lamas.

Gedun Drupa had no political power. It was in the hands of viceroys such as the Sakyas, the prince of Tsang, and the Mongolian Khagan. The political role of the Dalai Lamas only began with the reign of the 5th Dalai Lama.

He remained the abbot of Tashi Lhunpo Monastery until he died while meditating in 1474 at the age of 84 (83 by Western reckoning).

Legends 
Tradition states that Palden Lhamo, the female guardian spirit of the sacred lake, Lhamo La-tso, promised the First Dalai Lama in one of his visions "...that she would protect the reincarnation lineage of the Dalai Lamas." Since the time of Gedun Gyatso, who formalized the system, monks have gone to the lake to meditate when seeking visions with guidance on finding the next reincarnation.

Notable contemporaries 
The Samding Dorje Phagmo (1422–1455), the highest female incarnation in Tibet, was a contemporary of Gedun Drupa. Her teacher, the Bodongpa Panchen Chogley Namgyal was also one of his teachers; he received many teachings and empowerments from him.

Works
Some of the most famous texts Gedun Drupa wrote were:
 Sunlight on the Path to Freedom, a commentary on Abhidharma-kosa
 Crushing the Forces of Evil to Dust, an epic poem on the life and liberating deeds of Gautama Buddha
 Song of the Eastern Snow Mountain, a poem dedicated to Je Tsongkhapa
 Praise of the Venerable Lady Khadiravani Tara, an homage to Tara

References

Works cited

Further reading 
 McKay, A. (editor) (2003): History of Tibet. Publisher: RoutledgeCurzon. 
 Mullin, Glenn H. (2001). The Fourteen Dalai Lamas: A Sacred Legacy of Reincarnation, pp. 50–85. Clear Light Publishers. Santa Fe, New Mexico. .
 Dalai Elan Roebuck. (1991) Freedom in Exile: The Autobiography of the Dalai Lama. San Francisco, CA.
 Selected Works of the Dalai Lama I by Anne Kandt, Christine Cox, Dalai Lama Dge-Dun-Grub I, Glenn H. Mullin, Sidney Piburn (1985)

External links
 Tibetan Buddhist Resource Center

1391 births
1474 deaths
1
Tibetan writers
Tibetan people
14th-century Tibetan people
15th-century Tibetan people